Lytham Hospital is a health facility in Lytham St Annes, Lancashire. It is managed by Lancashire Care NHS Foundation Trust.

History

Cottage hospital
The Lytham Cottage Hospital and Convalescent Home, which was instituted for the relief of the poor when suffering from sickness or accident, was funded by Colonel John Talbot Clifton, Squire of Lytham, at an original cost of £1,200 and opened in 1871. The original building was a two-storey structure with four wards containing 16 beds. There was an operating room for "cases of a severe nature". A mortuary was located in the yard.

Benefactors included Elizabeth Layland, who in 1734 had left £60 for the poor or the education of children, enough to generate an annuity of over £2 each year for the cottage hospital.

The hospital was enlarged at a cost of £700 between 1882 and 1883. There were then 25 beds, some of which were made available for patients outside a five miles radius of Lytham. A new ward, in memory of Dr. L. Fisher, was subscribed for and built in around 1910.

The hospital was completely rebuilt in the late 1920s when a time capsule containing contemporary artifacts was buried for future discovery. The hospital joined the National Health Service in 1948.

Primary Care Centre
Following a consultation in 2006, in patient services were transferred Blackpool Victoria Hospital, and apart from two wards which were retained (Ansdell and Talbot Wards), the old the cottage hospital was completely demolished. A new Lytham Primary Care Centre was erected in its place and opened in June 2009.

See also
 List of hospitals in England

References

Hospital buildings completed in 1871
Hospitals in Lancashire
Buildings and structures in the Borough of Fylde
Health in Lancashire
Defunct hospitals in England
Lytham St Annes
Cottage hospitals